Seo Jae-chang (1866 – December 13, 1884) was a Korean politician, serviceperson, liberal ideologist during the Joseon dynasty. He was a member of the reformist Party(개화당;開化黨). In 1884 he was a participant in the Gapsin coup. The coup failed and he was arrested and executed. Seo was a younger brother of Seo Jae-pil.

Life 
Jae-chang was born 1866 In Bosong in South Jeolla Province. He was the fourth son of Seo Gwang-ho, governor of Dongbok County and Lady Lee of Seongju. His elder brothers were Jae-chun, Jae-hyung and Jae-pil and his younger brother was Jae-wu. He had two sisters.

He studied in Japan, recommended by Yu Dae-chi and Lee Dong-in. Jae-chang studied sericulture and military science. Later he returned to his country.

In 1884 he adopted a distant relation Seo Sang-wu's adopted son. In January to July, 1884, he returned to Japan. He entered a Toyama military school with Jae-pil, but in July he went to Seoul to plan a revolt with Kim Ok-kyun, Park Yeong-hyo and other members of Reformist Partys, Hong Yeong-sik, Park Yeong-kyo, Yun Chi-ho, Yun Ung-ryeol, Jae-pil and his father's fifth cousin Seo Kwang-pum.

In October, they undertook the Gapsin coup in Seoul. Queen Myeongseong mobilized Qing dynasty forces, who killed Hong Young-sik and Park Yeong-kyo in battle. The coup failed.

In October 21, Jae-chang escaped, but was seized by the Chinese. He was sent to Seoul prison of Uikeumbu(의금부;義禁府). On December 13, he was executed by firing squad, Gungigam (군기감; 軍器監) in Seoul. Only Jae-pil escaped on a Japanese boat to exile in Tokyo.

See also 
 Gapsin coup
 Seo Jae-pil

Site Link 
 서재필 선생의 외가, 보성 '성주 이씨' the Chosun-ilbo 2008.06.29 
 서재필 외가의 태교철학 담긴 보성 ohmynews 

Korean politicians
Assassinated Korean politicians
Deaths by firearm in China
1866 births
1894 deaths
People murdered in Korea
Soh Jaipil
Yun Chi-ho
People from South Jeolla Province
19th-century Korean people